WXXI may refer to:

 WXXI (AM), a radio station (1370 AM) licensed to Rochester, New York, United States
 WXXI-FM, a radio station (91.5 FM) licensed to Rochester, New York
 WXXI-TV, a television station (channel 22, virtual 21) licensed to Rochester, New York
 WXXI Public Broadcasting Council, organization that owns the above-listed stations

See also
 WXII-TV, a North Carolina television station